St Gothian Sands is a Local Nature Reserve near Gwithian, Cornwall. It was declared a Local Nature Reserve in 2005 by the Penwith District Council.

References

External links

 Cornwall Birding site guide
 A blog about the reserve

Local Nature Reserves in Cornwall